Cottle may refer to:

Places

 Cottle, Kentucky, United States
 Cottle County, Texas, United States
 Cottle (VTA) rail station, California, United States
 Cottle Church, Nevis, an Anglican church

Other uses
 Cottle (surname)
 USS Cottle (APA-147)